Radiigera is a genus of fungi in the family Geastraceae. The genus contain four widely distributed species.

References

Geastraceae
Agaricomycetes genera